The 1956 World Table Tennis Championships women's doubles was the 22nd edition of the women's doubles championship.
Ella Zeller and Angelica Rozeanu defeated Kiiko Watanabe and Fujie Eguchi in the final by three sets to two.

Results

See also
List of World Table Tennis Championships medalists

References

-
1956 in women's table tennis